Marihuana: The First Twelve Thousand Years is a book by Ernest Lawrence Abel about the history of cannabis, first published in 1980.

Table of contents 
 Cannabis in the Ancient World
 Hashish and the Arabs
 Rope and Riches
 Cannabis Comes to the New World
 New Uses for the Old Hemp Plant
 The Indian Hemp Drug Debate
 The African Dagga Cultures
 The Hashish Club
 Hashish in America
 America's Drug Users
 Reefer Racism
 The Jazz Era
 Outlawing Marihuana

Reception 
The book received reviews from publications including The Quarterly Review of Biology, Annals of Internal Medicine, Journal of Psychoactive Drugs, and The Public Historian.

See also 

 List of books about cannabis

References 

1980 books
Non-fiction books about cannabis